Phyllotreta zimmermanni, or Zimmerman's flea beetle, is a species of flea beetle in the family Chrysomelidae. It is holarctic, found in North America where it is considered invasive.

References

Further reading

 
 
 
 
 

Alticini
Beetles described in 1873